The Wrestling Observer Newsletter (WON) Hall of Fame is a professional wrestling and mixed martial arts hall of fame that recognizes people who make significant contributions to their professions. It was founded in 1996 by Dave Meltzer, editor of the Wrestling Observer Newsletter. Like many other wrestling halls of fame, such as the WWE, Impact, ROH and WCW halls of fame, the Wrestling Observer Newsletter Hall of Fame is not contained in a building, and there are no ceremonies for inductions other than a highly detailed biographical documentation of their career in the newsletter. Inductees include wrestlers/fighters, managers, promoters, trainers, and commentators. On ten occasions, groups, either tag teams, trios, or quartets, have been inducted rather than the individual members of the group. This first occurred in 1996, when The Fabulous Kangaroos and The Road Warriors entered the hall. The Fabulous Freebirds, The Midnight Express, The Rock 'n' Roll Express, The Assassins, The Holy Demon Army, The Sharpe Brothers, Los Misioneros de la Muerte, and Los Brazos all also entered as groups. On occasion entire wrestling families have been inducted into the hall. This first occurred in 1996 when The Dusek family entered the hall; in 2022, the five man familial team of Los Villanos was inducted.

Meltzer began the Hall of Fame by choosing a list of 122 inaugural inductees in 1996. Since then, wrestlers from past and present, others employed in the professional wrestling industry, and wrestling journalists and historians have been selected by Meltzer to cast secret ballots to determine annual groups of inductees. Voting criteria include the length of time spent in wrestling, historical significance, ability to attract viewers, and wrestling ability. Inductees must have at least 15 years of experience in the wrestling business or be over 35 years old and have 10 years of experience. To gain membership in the hall, potential inductees must receive 60% support on the ballots from their geographic region. Any person that gets less than 10% of the vote is eliminated from the ballot. If a person fails to get inducted 15 years after being put on the ballot, they must get 50% of the vote or be eliminated. There are 248 inductees, including the multiple teams, trios, and stables. 

In 2008, a recall vote was held asking if 2003 inductee Chris Benoit, who killed his wife and son before committing suicide in June 2007, should remain in the hall. To have Benoit removed, Meltzer required that 60% of voters must agree with the proposal. Although the majority voted for Benoit's removal, they only represented 53.6% of the votes, falling short of the number required. Benoit remains on the list of inductees.

Inductees

Footnotes

References 
 General
 
 Specific

External links 
 Online listing of the WON Hall of Fame 

1996 establishments in the United States
Awards established in 1996
Professional wrestling halls of fame
Sports hall of fame inductees
Halls of fame in California
Hall of Fame